The following is a list of episodes for the Australian television series, Satisfaction. The series began its first season on 5 December 2007 and finished its third and final season on 9 February 2010. It aired on the Showcase channel in Australia.

Series overview

Episodes

Season one (2007–08)

Season two (2008–09)

Season three (2009–10)

References

Satisfaction
Satisfaction (Australian TV series)